"Why Does Love Do This to Me" (alternatively spelt "Why Does Love (Do This to Me)") is a song by New Zealand pop band the Exponents. It was released in 1991 and is among the Exponents' most successful and best known songs.

History
Having moved to London in 1987, the single was the band's first release upon returning to New Zealand and changing their name from the Dance Exponents to the Exponents. The song was written by Jordan Luck in London in 1989, with the group returning to New Zealand in November 1990 and signing to PolyGram Records New Zealand.

The song proved popular, peaking at number three on the New Zealand Singles Chart, charting for 29 weeks. Its singalong chorus made the single a hit and helped make the Exponents a popular live band in the 1990s. The single was also released in Australia in 1993 but did not chart.

The song's music video was directed by Kerry Brown. It features the band playing the song in several iconic New Zealand landscapes, including a steamy thermal area, a bush road and by a cliffside.

In 2001, the song was ranked at number 47 on the APRA Top 100 New Zealand Songs of All Time list, as voted by APRA's members. The song was included on Nature's Best 2, a compilation album of songs number 31 to number 65 from the list. At the 1992 New Zealand Music Awards, the track was awarded Single of the Year.

"Why Does Love Do This to Me" is also known as a singalong anthem played during rugby games in New Zealand. Popularised during the 2005 British & Irish Lions tour to New Zealand, the song has become a stadium staple at New Zealand rugby events.

The track is on the Exponents' 1992 studio album Something Beginning with C and also gives its name to the band's 2011 greatest hits album Why Does Love Do This to Me: The Exponents Greatest Hits. The 2013 deluxe edition of Something Beginning with C includes the original UK demo version of the song.

Track listings

New Zealand 7-inch and cassette single (Mercury 868174-1/4)
 "Why Does Love Do This to Me" (3:25)
 "Sadness"

Australian CD single (Mercury 868177-2)
 "Why Does Love Do This to Me" (Craig Parteils remix)
 "Nameless Girl"
 "Sometimes"
 "Why Does Love Do This to Me" (video mix)

Personnel
 Jordan Luck – vocals
 Brian Jones – guitar
 David Gent – bass 
 Michael "Harry" Harallambi – drums

Charts

Weekly charts

Year-end charts

References

External links
 The Exponents discography - official site
 "Why Does Love Do This To Me" at Discogs
 Lyrics and chords (PDF)
 "Why Does Love Do This To Me" music video

1991 singles
1991 songs
APRA Award winners
The Exponents songs
Mercury Records singles
PolyGram singles